Čarolija is the eleventh studio album by Zdravko Čolić, released in 2003. Bora Đorđević, Bajaga, Nikša Bratoš, Arsen Dedić, Kemal Monteno, Đorđe David, Aleksandra Kovač and Đorđe Balašević took part in this album.

Track listing

Sound-alikes and covers 

 Song Mnogo hvala sampled Benzina by Massimo Savić.
 This album also contains covers of Indexi (Ako jednom budeš sama, dedicated to Davorin Popović) and Oleg Gazmanov (Zločin i kazna)

References

External links 

2003 albums
Zdravko Čolić albums